William Henry Long (7 March 1867 – 10 December 1947) was an American mycologist. He obtained his Bachelor degree at Baylor University in Waco, Texas in 1888, and then served as Professor of Natural Sciences at this university until 1892. Long entered graduate studies in 1899 under the supervision of W.L. Bray and W.M. Wheeler in 1899, and obtained a master's degree in 1900. For the following nine years he was Professor of Botany at North Texas State Normal College at Denton. Under the guidance of George F. Atkinson, Long performed field work at Cornell University, which eventually led to a PhD degree awarded from the University of Texas in 1917. His specialty was on tree rusts and wood rotting fungi.

References

American mycologists
1867 births
1947 deaths
Baylor University alumni
University of North Texas faculty
University of Texas at Austin College of Natural Sciences alumni
Baylor University faculty
People from Navarro County, Texas